The 2017–18 season was Norwich City's second consecutive season in the Championship. This season they participated in the Championship, FA Cup and League Cup.

The season covered the period from 1 July 2017 to 30 June 2018.

Transfers

Transfers in

Transfers out

Loans in

Loans out

Players

First-team squad

 (on loan from Manchester City)

 (on loan from Southampton)

 (on loan from FC Augsburg)

1 Current captain Russell Martin is on loan at Rangers, therefore Ivo Pinto will be the stand-in captain for the remainder of the season.

Pre-season

Friendlies
As of 27 June 2017, Norwich City have announced nine pre-season friendlies against Lowestoft Town, Stevenage, Cambridge United, Charlton Athletic, Brighton & Hove Albion, Cobh Ramblers, Sutton United, MSV Duisburg and Arminia Bielefeld.

Competitions

Overview

Championship

League table

Results by matchday

Results summary

Matches
On 21 June 2017, the league fixtures were announced.

FA Cup
In the FA Cup, Norwich City entered the competition in the third round and were drawn at home to Chelsea.

EFL Cup
On 16 June 2017, the first round draw took place with Swindon Town confirmed as opponents. A home tie was also confirmed for the second round, against Charlton Athletic. For the third round, an away tie against Brentford was confirmed. After reaching the fourth round for the third consecutive season, they were drawn to face Arsenal away from home.

Statistics

Appearances, goals and cards

Goalscorers

References

Norwich City F.C. seasons
Norwich City